The Little Ghost is a children's book, written by Otfried Preußler in 1966 with illustrations from Franz Josef Tripp. It was published by Thielemann publisher and was translated to 44 languages. It is one of the most famous books of the German children and youth literature.

Content 
The Little Ghost lives in the castle Eulenstein. Its best friend is an eagle-owl Schuhu. By shaking its bunch of keys, the Little Ghost can open everything that it wants, either a door or a treasure chest, without touching it. The biggest wish of the Little Ghost is to see the world during daylight. However, all its tries to stay awake after the witching hour fail. One day, after the Little Ghost gives up all its hope, it suddenly awakes at noon and not at midnight. During the discovery tour of the castle it suddenly sees a school class. While it tries to hide from them, it gets hit by a sunbeam and suddenly changes its color from white to black. Afterwards, it jumps into the castle well and opens a small door and gets to the sewer system of the city Eulenburg. Due to the large amount of pipes of the channel system, it cannot find its way back home to the castle Eulenstein, although it opens every channel output and causes a lot of chaos among the inhabitants of the City of Eulenberg, who start to call the Little Ghost black stranger Schwarzer Unbekannter.

Finally the Little Ghost causes a big disaster during the festival of the 325th anniversary of the siege of the Swedish soldiers. It attacks the actor of the Swedish Generals Torstenson,  believing that the General came back, after the little Ghost frightened him away 325 years ago. 325 years ago it felt disturbed by the loud noise of the cannons. After causing the chaos during the festival, it asks the children of the pharmacist for help, thereupon they go to the castle Eulenstein to search for Mr. Schuhu at midnight. Mr. Schuhu blames the wrong adjusted town hall clock for the unfortunate coincidence, as every ghost has to obey a special chime of the clock. After the watch master maker adjusts the town hall clock from the noon to the midnight hour, The Little Ghost finally wakes up at night and can return to its castle. While its return to the castle, it gets hit by a moon beam and finally its color changes back to white. Due to its happiness, because everything turned out all right, it dances on the castle pinnacle all witching hour long.

Characters

The Little Ghost 
The Little Ghost is a friendly night ghost. During the day it sleeps in an oak coffer, covered with iron, in the attic of the castle Eulenstein. Normally, The Little Ghost is very peaceful and does not harm anybody, except if somebody disturbs it, like the Swedish General Torsten Torstenson or the Governor of the castle, Mr. Georg-Kasimir. The Little Ghost feels disturbed by the loud noise of the cannons from the Swedish General Torsten Torstenson and banishes him from the castle. The governor of the castle, Mr. Georg-Kasimir, plans to throw out the Little Ghost from the window, so that it frightens him so much, that he jumps in the muddy castle moat. Moreover, the Little Ghost frightens the mayor of Eulenberg, as he claims that he does not believe in ghosts. On the other hand, the Little Ghost is very helpful, curious and friendly. It helps the countess Genoveva Elisabeth Barbara to find her valuable earrings, which were stolen from the window sill by a magpie. Moreover, it is very sad that the inhabitants of Eulenberg are scared of its black appearance.

The Eagle-Owl Schuhu 
The eagle-owl Schuhu is the best friend of the Little Ghost and lives in an empty oak on the castle hill. As an old and wise bird, the eagle-owl insists that everybody should talk respectfully to it and it always has some  good advice for the Little Ghost. Both, The Little Ghost and the eagle owl, like to tell stories. With the help of the eagle-owl, the little Ghost can return to the castle Eulenstein.

The General Torsten Torstenson 
The Swedish General Torsten Torstenson besieged the castle and the city of Eulenberg. As the Little Ghost could not sleep during the day, due to the loud noise of the cannons, it frightened the Swedish General so badly, that he terminated the siege and left the castle and the city with his army the next day. A portrait of the Swedish General Torsten Torstenson still remains in the knight hall of the castle, as a reminder of his siege and once in a while the Little Ghost speaks to it. Furthermore, the Little Ghost tries to stay awake after the witching hour with the valuable pocket alarm clock, which the General Torsten Torstenson lost during the siege. During the 325th anniversary of the siege of Eulenburg, the brewery director plays the role of the Swedish General Torsten Torstenson, so that the Little Ghost believes that the General returned.

The Children of the Pharmacist 
The eleven year old Herbert and his siblings, the nine year old twins Jutta and Günther, help the Little Ghost to find its way back home to the castle. While the Little Ghost spends the night in the cellar of the pharmacy, it hears the conversation between the children and it finds out that the Swedish General and his soldiers, whom the Little Ghost saw earlier that day, were actors. At night, the three children sneak out to find the eagle-owl Mr. Schuhu in his empty oak, to ask for its advice. They can understand the eagle-owl with the help of the bunch of keys from the Little Ghost. After speaking with Mr. Schuhu, the children go to the watch master maker and ask him to adjust the town hall clock. He repairs it. Furthermore, the three children write together with the Little Ghost a letter to the mayor in which it apologizes for its behavior.

Origin 
When Otfried Preußler was a child, his grandmother Dora told him stories very often. One of these stories was about a White Lady (ghost) who predicted births and deaths in the family of her descendants and who moreover protected her home very often. Once, the white lady closed away the Swedish General Torstenson Torstenson from the castle of her father, by shooing him out of his bed, giving him a telling off, while he was only wearing his night clothes and begging for mercy. Preußler always kept this scene in mind and while he was writing the book of the history of the white lady, the white lady converted to the Little Ghost.

Editions 
The original Thienemann edition was later published with different front pages and with different publishers, like the German Bücherbund, the Büchergilde Gutenberg, Bertelsmann Lesering (RM book and media) and with its successor Club Bertelsmann.

The original illustrations from Franz Joseph Tripp were used for the international publishing. However, some editions were published with new illustrations on the front page, like e. g. the Spanish version “El pequeño fantasma” or some Russian versions from Malenkoe Prividenie. The Dutch version “Het spookje” was completely new illustrated by Ingrid Schubert.

In the year 2013,  in which Preußler celebrated his 90th birthday, Thienemann published two new editions of The Little Ghost. One edition was published in color for the first time and available as an e-book, together with his other books The Little Water Sprite, The Little Witch and the three volumes of The Robber Hotzenplotz. Mathias Weber, an illustrator,  colored the original black and white illustrations, with which he made the dream of the author come true. The other new edition, called “The Little Ghost – the book of the movie”Das kleine Gespenst – Das Buch zum Kinofilm, was published. It was published together with the movie at Preußler's birthday. However, the book differs from the movie and has the same content as the original book edition, apart from the design of the front page. Unfortunately, Otfried Preußler died in the beginning of 2013, so that he did not see neither the new editions of his book nor the movie.

For the 50th anniversary of The Little Ghost, Susanne Preußler-Bitsch, Otfried Preußler's daughter, published a picture book Bilderbuch with the title “The Little Ghost -  Tohuwabohu in the castle Eulenstein”. It was Otfried Preußler's idea. Daniel Napp illustrated the book.

Awards 
 1967: in the selected list for the German Children's Literature Award
 1988: IBBY Honour List for the Greek translation

Adaptations

Audio Media
In the 1970s the company Phonogram published a very famous audio versionHörspiel of the book on Phonograph record and cassettes under its label Record label Philips and Fontana, which at present is still available with the successor company Universal Music  with the label Karussell. The voice of the Little Ghost is from Christa Häussler, the storyteller has the voice from Hans Baur. In 1996 the audio play received a Gold Record award Gold. A new edition, which was published by Karussell with the label Spectrum Junior, reached the platinum status in 1998.  In 2000 a sing book with the title “ Hui-Huh! Little Ghost! – Funny and fantastic ghost songs” was published to the previous mentioned version. In 2008 a new version was published, consisting of two new versions of the audio with Michael Habeck, speaking as The Little Ghost and Peter Strieback, speaking as the story teller. The first part received the Golden Vinyl Record (Kids Award) in 2014. Der erste Teil wurde 2014 mit der Goldenen Schallplatte (Kids-Award) ausgezeichnet.

In 2008, the audio editorial from the WDR WDR published a further audio play, with Fritzi Haberlandt as storyteller, Jens Wawrczeck as the little ghost and Friedhelm Ptok as the eagle-owl Mr. Schuhu. In 2011 the same editorial published the audio book Hörbuch. Nora Tschirner reads the uncut version.

Together with the movie an extra audio play was published in 2013, where the actors gave their voice to the same characters that they played in the movie.

In 2016, the audio editorial published the audio play “The Little Ghost – Tohuwabohu in the castle  Eulenstein”, with the voices from Anna Thalbach, speaking The Little Ghost, Susanne Preußler- Bitsch, speaking the storyteller and Santiago Ziesmer speaking as the eagle-owl Mr. Schuhu. The audio CD corresponds to the picture book, from Preußler and Susanne Preußler-Bitsch.

Learning Media
In 1996 Ursula Hänggi, from the publisher Verlag an der Ruhr, published a literature card index according to the children's book from Otfried Preußler. Among other things the card index contains worksheets, language and spelling games as well as a riddle for language teaching.

In 1998 and 2005, two different audio plays, with the title “Learning English with The Little Ghost” were published by Karussell. The version published in 2005 received the gold record (Kids Award) in 2014. Two French version were published in 2002 and 2005. Furthermore, in 2005 the same publisher, published an English audio play.

The Thienemann publisher published a book “ The Little Ghost – Learning English with The Little Ghost” in which difficult and not often used words are explained at the end of every chapter.

In 2004 Edizioni Lang published a further learn book with the title “The Little Ghost – words and pictures” to learn Italian.

In 2008 a pocket book for schools was published. In the same year, Björn Bauch published a book for teaching lessons with the title “The Little Ghost – Comments and Copy templates for teaching lessons for the second and third grade”.

Movies
In 1969, The Little Ghost was released as a two-part puppet movie, in the television. Rudolf Fischer and Albrecht Roser, who also directed the movie, were among others the puppeteers.

The Soviet sowjetische television released the real movie “Ghost from Eulenburg” (Russian language: Привидение из города Ойленберга, Transliteration: Privideniye iz goroda Oylenberga), which is based on Preußler's book. Anatoly Ravikovitch directed the movie and acted as The Little Ghost in the movie.

In 1992, the cartoonist Curt Linda produced the cartoon “The Little Ghost” with the voice from Elfriede Kuzmany, speaking The Little Ghost. Gustl Weishappel gave her voice to the eagle-owl.

In 2013, Universum Film released the movie “The Little Ghost”, directed by Alain Gsponer.  Anna Thalbach gave her voice to the computer animated little Ghost. Wolfgang Hess gave his voice to the eagle owl and Uwe Ochsenknecht  acted as the mayor and the General Torsten Torstenson. Herbert Knaup acted the watch master maker Zifferle.

Games
In the 1970s, the Berliner Spielkarten GmbH published a Happy Families card game with the illustrations of Preußler's book.

Kai Haferkamp published a board game with the title “The Little Ghost” with the publisher Kosmos. In 2005 the memory game received the award of the best children game Kinderspiel des Jahres. In 2010 Haferkamp published a search game with the title “The Little Ghost – Souvenirs”.

In 2016, Haferkamp published three more games with the toy company Habermaaß. One game is a Puzzle with three motives from Preußler's book, furthermore they published a memory game with the title “ The Little Ghost – Race to the castle Eulenstein”. The third game is a 3D memory game, with the title “ The Little Ghost – haunting in Eulenstein”.

Theater
Otfried Preußler wrote a stage play of The Little Ghost. The premiere was in the theater in Rosenheim, in 1989. Since 1990, the publisher for children theater has all the performance rights.  Among others, the Augsburger Puppet show Augsburger Puppenkiste and Gerhards Puppet theater performed the stage play.

Jewgenij Sitochin directed a children opera corresponding to the book from Preußler. The premiere took place in the opera house in Graz Opernhaus Graz in 2011. Walther Soyka composed the music and the Libretto came from Bernhard Studlar. The Vienna Pocket opera produced it in cooperation with the Opera Graz.

Literature
 Otfried Preußler, Franz Josef Tripp (Illustrator): Das kleine Gesepnst, 52nd edition, Thienemann, Stuttgart / Wien 2011 (first edition 1966), 
 The little ghost, illustrated by F.J. Tripp, translated from the German by Anthea Bell. Abelard-Schuman 1967; London: Andersen Press, 2013.

External links 
 Das kleine Gespenst on the web page of the author 
 Das kleine Gespenst as reading sample by Thienemann-Verlag (PDF, 1.59 MB, 14 S.)

Sources 

1966 German novels
1966 children's books
German children's novels
Fictional ghosts
Fictional owls
Ghosts in popular culture